Several years have been referred to as the Year of the Three Kings or Year of Three Kings. This list does  include all years in which a country has had three kings or three claimants to the throne.

1016 in England Æthelred the Unready died in April, leaving the throne to Edmund Ironside, who reigned only until November, when he died and was succeeded by Cnut the Great.
1066 in England Harold Godwinson (Earl of Wessex), William the Conqueror (Duke of Normandy), and Harald Hardrada (King of Norway) all claimed the title of King of England.
1483 in England Edward IV died in April. His son Edward V, reigned until June, when his uncle and Lord Protector, Richard III, deposed him.
1888 and 1889 in Buganda Mwanga II fled in September 1888 after his chiefs sought to replace him with his brother, Kiweewa. Six weeks later, Muslim chiefs captured Kiweewa and replaced him with their initial pick to be kabaka, Kalema. In 1889, Mwanga retook the throne from Kiweewa.
1936 in the United Kingdom After the death of George V in January, his son Edward VIII became king, only to abdicate in December amidst a constitutional crisis. He was succeeded by his brother, George VI.

See also 
 Year of the Three Emperors (German Empire, 1888)
 Year of three popes (thirteen years, plus one year of four popes)
 Year of three prime ministers (several years)
 Year of the Four Emperors (Roman Empire, 69)
 Year of the Five Emperors (Roman Empire, 193)
 Year of the Six Emperors (Roman Empire, 238)
 List of shortest-reigning monarchs, other kings who reigned for only part of a calendar year

Notes

References